Jack Charles Scanlon (born 6 August 1998) is an English former child actor who is best known for his role in the 2008 Holocaust film The Boy in the Striped Pyjamas.

Early and personal life
Jack Charles Scanlon was born in Canterbury, Kent, and now lives in Deal with his parents and younger brother. He attended Sir Roger Manwood's School in nearby Sandwich. He also attended Bath Spa University, where he studied Commercial Music.

Career
He auditioned for The Boy in the Striped Pajamas through his drama club and was eventually cast as Shmuel after director Mark Herman narrowed his choice down to about three possible candidates and paired each with Asa Butterfield for a final audition together. According to Herman: "Jack and Asa played very well against one another."

Although The Boy in the Striped Pajamas is Scanlon's feature film debut, he did act before. He appeared in a 10-minute short film titled The Eye of the Butterfly (which led to him being suggested to the casting director of The Boy in the Striped Pyjamas) and in a 2007 episode of the Peter Serafinowicz Show.

Scanlon also played the younger brother of main character Sean (William Miller) in the 2009 British children's miniseries Runaway, broadcast on BBC One, which was part of the CBBC season about homelessness.

Filmography

Film

Television

Accolades

References

External links

English male child actors
English male film actors
People from Canterbury
People from Deal, Kent
English male television actors
Living people
1998 births
Male actors from Kent
People educated at Sir Roger Manwood's School